The CECAFA Women's Champions League is annual international women's association football club competition. The tournament organised by the Council for East and Central Africa Football Associations, and will involve the top women's club teams of association members nations. It is the female counterpart of the CAF Champions League.

History
Council for East and Central Africa Football Associations association members board meeting has decided to introduce women's clubs competitions for represents their females teams to the CAF Women's Champions League the women's continental club competition.

Results

Top goalscorers

References

External links

2021
Women's Champions League
2021 in women's association football